Leonardo Henriques da Silva (Penápolis, July 22, 1982), also known as Léo San, is a Brazilian footballer who acts as a defender.

Career
Léo San began his career in the youth of the Guarani and was still very early work in Japanese football. In 2004, he was hired by Montedio Yamagata where he remained until the end of 2009. In the 2010 season, he appeared to reinforce the regional competitions would compete Avaí where national and international.

In March 2011, he has agreed to move Chinese Super League side Qingdao Jonoon.

Club statistics

Honours
Avaí
Campeonato Catarinense: 2010

References

External links

Jogadores do Brasil 

1982 births
Living people
Brazilian footballers
Brazilian expatriate footballers
Guarani FC players
Avaí FC players
Qingdao Hainiu F.C. (1990) players
Campeonato Brasileiro Série A players
J1 League players
J2 League players
Chinese Super League players
Montedio Yamagata players
Expatriate footballers in Japan
Expatriate footballers in China
Brazilian expatriate sportspeople in China
Association football defenders
People from Penápolis